Mathilakam is a village in Kodungallur taluk, Thrissur district in Kerala, South India. It is located around 5 miles north of Kodungallur on National Highway 66.  

Mathilakam is generally identified by historians as the location of the medieval Shiva temple, the Thirukkunavay Temple. The shrine was also known as the Kunavayir Kottam, the monastery of Ilamko Atikal (the author of the Tamil epic Chilappathikaram). The temple has been highly eulogized in the Tamil Shaiva literature of Tevaram as early as the 7th century CE. The Tamil Nayanmar saint Sundarar is said to have visited the temple before attaining Moksha. 

Excavations were conducted by Archaeological Survey of India at Mathilakam in 1967. In the excavations conducted in 1970, an 8th-9th century AD foundation, structurally different from the standard Hindu temple foundations in shape, was revealed.

Kerala State Archaeological Department conducted a field survey at Mathilakam in 2014. In 2020, the Archaeological Survey of India granted licence to a non-profit trust to undertake excavations in Mathilakam. The first phase of the excavations was started with the opening of six trial trenches. The trust completed the trial excavations at Mathilakam in 2020.

References

Villages in Thrissur district
Archaeological sites in Kerala